Zemiropsis papillaris, common name : the spotted , is a species of sea snail, a marine gastropod mollusk in the family Babyloniidae.

Description
The spotted babylon has a plump shell, which varies in size between 33 mm and 50 mm. The shell has a smooth surface and is white with reddish-brown spots in an indistinct lattice pattern. The foot is spotted with vivid red.

Distribution
This species is only found off the South African coast from False Bay to the eastern Transkei in 15-65m under water. It is endemic to this area.

References

 Dekker (2008). Gloria Maris 46 (4–5) : 106–112

External links
 

Babyloniidae
Gastropods described in 1825